Nanay, Tatay is a Filipino traditional children's game. It was made popular during the early 70s

Gameplay 
The game is played by two or more players while clapping and chanting the following Tagalog verses:

"Nanay, Tatay, gusto ko’ng  tinapay, Ate, Kuya, gusto ko’ng kapé. Lahát ng gusto ko ay súsundin niyó; ang mágkamalì ay pípingutin ko!"

(“Mummy, Daddy, I want some bread; Big sister, Big brother, I want coffee. All I want, you’re gonna do; make a mistake and I’m gonna pinch you!”)

The moment a player makes a mistake, they will be "punished" by the other player by getting pinched on the nose or ear, or any other punishment of the winner’s choice.

See also 

 Traditional games in the Philippines
 Pak ganern game

References

Philippine games
Children's games
Tagalog-language songs
Hand games